Garra trewavasai is a species of ray-finned fish in the genus Garra.
The specific name of this fish honours the British ichthyologist Ethelwynn Trewavas (1900-1993).

References 

Endemic fauna of Nigeria
Garra
Taxa named by Théodore Monod
Fish described in 1950